Atallah Al-Anazi (born 22 February 1988) is a Saudi Arabian sports shooter. He competed in the men's 10 metre air pistol event at the 2016 Summer Olympics.

References

External links
 

1988 births
Living people
Saudi Arabian male sport shooters
Olympic shooters of Saudi Arabia
Shooters at the 2016 Summer Olympics
Shooters at the 2014 Asian Games
Shooters at the 2018 Asian Games
Asian Games competitors for Saudi Arabia
20th-century Saudi Arabian people
21st-century Saudi Arabian people